Periklis Christoforides (1907 – 30 September 1983) was an Ottoman-born Greek film actor.  He appeared in more than 120 films between 1929 and 1979. He was born in Trebizond, Ottoman Empire, and died in Thessaloniki, Greece, following a stroke. His body was flown to Athens on the day of his death and buried the next day.

Selected filmography
 Madame X (1956) ..... Giannakis Spiggos
 The Fortune Teller (1956) ..... Andreas Giavasis / Velliris
 The Girl from Corfu (1956)
 We Have Only One Life (1958) ..... Manolis
 A Hero in His Slippers (1958) ..... minister
 Liar Wanted (1961) ..... Agis
 The Downfall (1961) ..... Filippas Kyriazopoulos
 Something Is Burning (1964) ..... Mr. Nikolaidis
 I chartopaichtra (1964) ..... Andreas's friend
 Allos gia to ekatommyrio (1964) ..... Leonidas Karpidis
 Kiss the Girls (1965) ..... Mr. Eleftheriou
 Voitheia! O Vengos faneros praktor 000 (1967) ..... school director
 Thou-Vou falakros praktor, epiheirisis "Yis Mathiam" (1969) ..... school director

References

External links

1907 births
1983 deaths
Greek male film actors
20th-century Greek male actors
People from Trabzon
Emigrants from the Ottoman Empire to Greece
Pontic Greeks
Greek male silent film actors